The L&YR Class 30 (Hughes compound) was a class of 0-8-0 steam locomotives of the Lancashire and Yorkshire Railway, designed by George Hughes. The prototype was rebuilt from an Aspinall Class 30 locomotive in 1904. Ten new locomotives were built in 1907. The locomotives passed to the London, Midland and Scottish Railway (LMS) in 1923.

Design
These were four cylinder compound locomotives with two high pressure cylinders and two low pressure cylinders.

Numbering

Withdrawal
All were withdrawn and scrapped between 1926 and 1927. None were preserved.

References

0-8-0 locomotives
30 (Hughes compound)
Railway locomotives introduced in 1904
Standard gauge steam locomotives of Great Britain
Scrapped locomotives
D n4v locomotives